John S. Macdonald may refer to:
John Sandfield Macdonald, first Premier of Ontario
Harry Macdonough (John Scantlebury Macdonald), Canadian singer and recording executive of the early 20th century
John S. MacDonald, Canadian engineer and businessman
John Smyth Macdonald (1867–1941), British physiologist

See also
John Macdonald (disambiguation)